Jim the World's Greatest is a 1976 drama film written and directed by Don Coscarelli and Craig Mitchell. The movie began production when Coscarelli and Mitchell were 18-year-olds, while being financed by their parents at a stated cost of $250,000.

Plot
Jim Nolan (Gregory Harrison) is a high school teenager. Jim and his family, consisting of himself, his Father (Rory Guy, who would later become more famously known under his adopted stage name, Angus Scrimm), and his younger brother Kelly (Robbie Wolcott), live in a dingy apartment in a bad part of town. During the day, Jim is a popular high school kid, attending classes and playing on the school football team. At night, he works at a fast-food restaurant, earning money to help keep the family solvent.

The father is an alcoholic salesman who often disappears for long stretches. Whenever the father is home, he has a tendency to physically abuse Jim's younger brother. It is during a pivotal moment in the story where Jim, having grown indignant and impatient with his father's abusive treatment of his younger brother, angrily confronts his father about his violent behavior, wondering aloud how any father could possibly treat his own son so badly, when the father reveals that the reason Kelly is so frequently the target of the father's abuse is because he accuses Kelly of having been the product of an illicit extramarital affair (Quote: "He's not my son. He's your mother's son"). Even when presented with this new insight regarding his relation to his younger brother, Jim, whether out of denial, naivete, just plain indifference, or perhaps not entirely grasping what had been told to him or its deeper significance, Jim (for whichever of the speculative reasons) does not share this bombshell information with his younger brother, not even when Kelly asks Jim directly why the father "hates" him yet treats Jim so warmly.

Tensions between Jim and his father come to a head when after another incident of Kelly's victimization at the hands of the father, despite the father's promise to Jim that he would henceforth cease such activity, Jim insists that his father pack a bag and depart from the premises, thus requiring Jim to assume the role of Primary Caregiver for Kelly and the sustainer of the household.

Some unspecified amount of time has passed when we once again catch-up with the father, drinking inside a tavern, muttering to himself that he plans on paying his son, Jim, a visit the following morning to talk things out and hopefully regain acceptance back into the household. It just so happened however that the time when the father arrived at the apartment in order to meet with Jim, he found that Kelly was its only occupant, as Jim was out working at his job at the time.

Concerned that Kelly had not shown-up at the restaurant to receive his dinner at the agreed upon time, and that he still had not done so over an hour later, Jim becomes noticeably concerned and rushes to their apartment, searching the unit for his little brother and calling out to him, only to eventually find Kelly lying dead in the bath tub. Jim then proceeds to carry the lifeless body of his younger brother out into the street in an emotionally distraught state.

Convinced that his father was responsible for his brother's death, Jim decides to wait outside of the pub his father frequented until the last few patrons filed out at closing time. Large knife in hand, Jim displays a premeditated intent to end the life of his father; so determined is he in fact that at one point he comes terrifyingly close to accidentally stabbing from behind an innocent man who was stumbling & fumbling his way into his car: unbeknownst to Jim at the time, his father had been outside observing his son's actions and intentions from a darkened area along a wall.

Later, Jim's father calls, begging to meet at an abandoned location so that he might plead his case and ask his son's forgiveness regarding the "accidental" death he admits having been responsible for bringing about. Jim arrives at the meet-up spot at the specified time, once again with a murderous determination, until out of frustration and/or lack of determination he drops the knife and sinks slowly to the ground, at which point his father calls out to him and appears standing a short distance away from him, presenting himself before his son in his own emotionally broken state, as well as at the final mercy of his son, unsure, and perhaps even uncaring, of whatever response he might receive from Jim in response.

Cast
Gregory Harrison as Jim Nolan
Robbie Wolcott as Kelly Nolan
Rory Guy as Jim's father, Mr. Nolan
Marla Pennington as Jan
Karen McLain as Lisa
David Lloyd as Brian
Reggie Bannister as O.D. Silengsly

References

External links

1976 films
1970s teen drama films
American teen drama films
American coming-of-age drama films
Films directed by Don Coscarelli
Universal Pictures films
1976 directorial debut films
1976 drama films
1970s English-language films
1970s American films